Rıfat Osman Bey (1874 – 10 May 1939) was a Turkish physician, writer and historian, who was one of the patriarchs of the pseudoscientific Sun Language Theory.

References 

1874 births
1933 deaths
Place of death missing
Physicians from Istanbul
20th-century Turkish historians
20th-century Turkish physicians